Avilés Hurtado Herrera (born 20 April 1987) is a Colombian professional footballer who plays as a forward and attacking midfielder for Liga MX club Pachuca.

He is a Mexican naturalized citizen.

He began his career in Colombia before moving to Mexico in 2013, after an underwhelming spell at Pachuca he was bought by Chiapas where he was one of the team's most important players, he moved to Tijuana in 2016 and became one of the best players in the league being named in the season's best XI for the Clausura 2017 tournament where he scored 8 goals, in the summer of 2017 he was purchased by Monterrey for a fee of US$9,000,000 making him the most expensive signing in the history of the club.

Club career

On 15 December 2012, Hurtado sign a four-year contract with Liga MX team CF Pachuca.

In June 2013, the Colombian player and Chiapas F.C. agreed on a season-long loan. He made his debut with Chiapas in a 2-2 tied game against Veracruz, having score twice for the Jaguars.

He returned to Pachuca for the 2014 Apertura.

In December 2014, Hurtado returned to Chiapas for the Liga MX Clausura 2014.

International career 

On November 4, 2017 Hurtado was given his first international call-up by Colombia after his performances in Monterrey.

Honours
Monterrey
Liga MX: Apertura 2019
Copa MX: Apertura 2017, 2019–20
CONCACAF Champions League: 2019, 2021

Pachuca
Liga MX: Apertura 2022

Individual
Liga MX Best XI: Clausura 2017, Apertura 2017
Liga MX Golden Boot (Shared): Apertura 2017
 Univision Deportes Award Best Player Liga MX: 2017
Nominated in the Top 10 of the Puskas Award: 2017
Liga MX All-Star: 2022

References

1987 births
Living people
Association football forwards
Colombian footballers
Sportspeople from Cauca Department
América de Cali footballers
Atlético Nacional footballers
C.F. Pachuca players
Chiapas F.C. footballers
Club Tijuana footballers
C.F. Monterrey players
Liga MX players
Categoría Primera A players
Categoría Primera B players
Colombian expatriate footballers
Expatriate footballers in Mexico
Naturalized citizens of Mexico
Colombian expatriate sportspeople in Mexico